Gandini is an Italian surname. Notable people with the surname include:

Antonio Gandini (1565–1630), Spanish Renaissance painter
Brenda Gandini (born 1984), Argentine actress and model
Erik Gandini (born 1967), Italian film director
Ettore Gandini (born 1969), Italian footballer
Franco Gandini (born 1936), Italian cyclist
Gerardo Gandini (1936–2013), Argentine composer
Giorgio Gandini del Grano (died 1538), Italian painter of the Parma school
John Gandini (born 1929), Australian trade unionist
Len Gandini (born 1962), Australian rules footballer
Marcello Gandini (born 1938), Italian automobile designer
Saverio Gandini (1729–1796), Italian painter

Other
Gandini Lianos (born 1987), show jumping horse

See also

Italian-language surnames